Harry Crawford may also refer to:
Harry Crawford (politician) (born 1952), American politician in Alaska
Harry Crawford (footballer) (born 1991), English footballer
Harry Crawford, character in the TV series Boon
Harry Leo Crawford (Eugenia Falleni), a transgender man convicted of murder

See also
Henry Crawford (disambiguation)
Harold Crawford (disambiguation)
Harry Crawford Black (1887–1956), American businessperson, newspaper executive and philanthropist